Elections in Georgia are held to fill various state and federal seats. Georgia regular elections are held every even year. The positions being decided each year varies, as the terms of office varies. The State Senate, State House and U.S. House will typically be up for election, as all of those positions have two-year terms. Special elections are held to fill vacated offices. Georgia is one of seven states that require a run-off election if no candidate receives a majority of the vote in a primary election. Uniquely, Georgia requires a run-off election for state and congressional offices if no candidate wins a majority of the vote in a general election; only Louisiana has a similar requirement, but it operates under a different election system.

In a ranking of U.S. states by electoral integrity by PEI electoral integrity project conducted in 2018, Georgia ranked 51st among all U.S. states and District of Columbia. While all other states' electoral integrity was valued at very high, high or moderate- Georgia was the only state in the rankings to be designated as a state with low electoral integrity. It scored 49 out of 100 in the PEI index, getting lowest marks in voting boundaries (18 out of 100) and the highest in Party and candidate registration (67 out of 100).

In a 2020 study, Georgia was ranked as the 2nd hardest state for citizens to vote in.

History

Following the end of martial law and readmission to the Union during Reconstruction, Georgia was overwhelmingly dominated by the Democratic Party for a hundred years, as were many other states of the Confederacy. White voters often perceived the Republican Party as the party of the North standing for Yankee values, growing industrialisation, and an excessively powerful and interfering federal government, all arrayed against their localized agricultural society. The abolition of slavery by amendment to the U.S. Constitution and the legacy of an economy damaged by war and social upheaval led many to bitterly oppose a wide variety of national policies.

Elections to the U.S. Congress during this period saw almost exclusively Democratic senators and either totally or almost-totally Democratic House rule.  From 1872 to 2002, Georgia voters consistently elected Democrats as governor and Democratic majorities to the state legislature. Like many other Southern states, the Democratic-controlled legislature established run-off elections for primaries in which no candidate receives more than 50% of the vote. In addition, the Democratic primaries were further defined by their usage of the white primary to exclude African Americans and other ethnicities from participation, as well as the usage of the county unit system from 1898 to 1963 to allocate votes to winners along rural-biased lines.

Historically, elections at all levels of government in the U.S. state of Georgia were dominated by conservative white Democrats in the period between Reconstruction and the end of the New Deal Coalition. For decades, Republicans were a tiny minority, generally associated with Union military victory at the end of the Civil War. Indeed, for several years, the Republicans did not even field a candidate for governor or any other statewide elected office.

Beginning in the 1950s, the credible enforcement of new laws inspired by the Civil Rights Movement began to steadily erode the preponderance of Democrats in elective office in Georgia. The repeal of Jim Crow laws allowed previously disenfranchised African Americans to vote in elections and be active in politics. As many of these people joined with some white Democrats to work for more immediate liberal and pluralistic policies, a growing number of conservative white Democrats who supported either gradual change or none at all either began splitting their tickets at the national level or switching outright to the GOP. The strong showing in Georgia by Republican President Dwight D. Eisenhower in the 1956 presidential race proved to be a turning point. Georgia would remain competitive at the national level for most of the rest of the 20th century. the Republican Party appeared positioned to gain even more ground in the coming years. The Democratic Party did not carry the state from the 1960 election until Jimmy Carter ran for the White House 16 years later.

Modern times and the shift to Republican dominance 
Beginning with Barry Goldwater's presidential bid in 1964, the Republican Party began making inroads in Georgia. The state swung over dramatically to support Goldwater—the first time it had gone Republican in a presidential election in American history. In time, the Republican Party of Georgia would field competitive candidates and win races for seats in the U.S. Senate and U.S. House of Representatives. Republicans also began making gains at the state level, mostly in the Atlanta suburbs.  However, conservative Democrats continued to hold most offices at the local level well into the 1990s.

In presidential races, Georgia has given its electoral college votes to the Republican candidate all but five times since 1964: in 1968, segregationist George Wallace won a plurality of Georgia's votes on the American Independent Party ticket; former Georgia Governor Jimmy Carter won his home state by landslide margins in 1976 and 1980 (sweeping every county in the state in 1976); then-Arkansas Governor Bill Clinton won a plurality of votes in 1992 against incumbent Republican George H. W. Bush and Independent Ross Perot; and former Delaware Senator and Vice-President Joe Biden won a plurality of votes in 2020 against incumbent Republican Donald Trump. Republican George W. Bush won Georgia by double digits in 2000 and 2004, with 54.67% and 57.97%, respectively, of the vote, making him the only Republican presidential candidate to carry Georgia twice. In 2008, John McCain won the state by a narrower margin of only 5 points, winning 52% to Democrat Barack Obama's 47%. In 2012, Mitt Romney won the state with 53% to Obama's 45%. In 2016, Donald Trump won the state with 51% to Hillary Clinton's 46%.

By 2007, conservative Republicans had become the dominant force in state elections, with Republicans holding the offices of governor and lieutenant governor and significant majorities in both houses of the state General Assembly.

As in many states, Democratic strongholds in Georgia include urban and minority-dominated areas. Democrats typically fare well in cities such as Atlanta (and its suburbs such as Gwinnett County), Macon, and Columbus, which have large minority populations, as well as Athens, home of the University of Georgia. The Republican Party dominates state elections through its hold on rural south Georgia, with a very notable exception in the southwestern part of the state; the Appalachian north; and many of Atlanta's further suburbs and exurbs. Former Speaker of the United States House of Representatives Newt Gingrich, co-author of the Contract with America and architect of the 1994 "Republican Revolution,"  represented a district in Cobb County, a suburban Atlanta county which has since flipped to supporting Democratic candidates since 2016.

A feature of Georgia elections is the requirement for 50%-plus-one majorities in general and primary elections, triggering runoff elections if no candidate receives a majority. From 1898 to 1962, the Democratic Party used a combination of the white primary and the county unit system to ensure that only white rural voters' preferences were reflected in the de facto election of political offices across the state, although the white primary was abolished in the federal case King v. Chapman (1945). After the county unit system was struck down by the Supreme Court case Gray v. Sanders (accompanied by the election of Carl Sanders, who became the first Democrat to be nominated for governor by popular vote since the establishment of the county unit system), the General Assembly passed a bill to switch future Georgia elections to runoff voting. The bill was introduced and sponsored by Macon legislator Denmark Groover, who proposed that runoff voting "would again provide protection which … was removed with the death of the county unit system" and warned that "[W]e have got to go the majority vote because all we have to have is a plurality and the Negroes and the pressure groups and special interests are going to manipulate this State and take charge."

However, the following ascendance of the Republican Party culminated in the 1992 defeat of incumbent Wyche Fowler by Republican Paul Coverdell by runoff, despite Fowler leading the first round by a plurality. This led the Georgia Legislature, then controlled by Democrats, to change the state's laws requiring a run-off election only if the winning candidate received less than 45% of the vote. In the 1996 Senate election, the winner, Democrat Max Cleland won with only 48.9% (1.4% ahead of Republican Guy Millner) thus avoiding a run-off. In 2005 after Republicans took control of the legislature, the run-off requirement was changed back to 50%, in the same bill which implemented a requirement for Voter ID.

Current status
The current Governor of Georgia is Brian Kemp, who was elected as a Republican in 2018. The Lieutenant Governor is Geoff Duncan. Other elected state executive officials include Secretary of State Brad Raffensperger, Attorney General Chris Carr, Commissioner of Insurance Jim Beck, and Superintendent of Schools Richard Woods.

The Georgia General Assembly has been controlled by the Republicans since 2004. They have majorities over the Democrats in both the Senate and House of Representatives by margins of 35 to 21 and 105 to 75 respectively as of 2019. In congressional elections, until the 2021 runoffs, Georgia was represented in the U.S. Senate by David Perdue and Kelly Loeffler, both Republicans, with Loeffler having been appointed by Governor Brian Kemp after Johnny Isakson announced his retirement in 2019. The state also sends 14 members to the U.S. House of Representatives, which in 2019 included 9 Republicans and 5 Democrats.

However, in 2018, Democratic gubernatorial candidate Stacey Abrams received 49% of the vote, resulting in the closest gubernatorial election since 1966; a following runoff for Secretary of State was the first time that a statewide constitutional office was subjected to a runoff election.

In the early 2020s, despite a Republican trifecta in the state government, the state became a competitive swing state, with Democrats, including two progressive senators, winning all three statewide federal races. The state voted for Joe Biden for president‚ and senators Jon Ossoff, and Raphael Warnock, the state's first Black senator. The win was reported to be due to the increased turnout in African-American voters due to the work of Stacey Abrams and LaTosha Brown. Raffensperger announced in 2020 that about 1,000 Georgians face investigation for voting twice in primary elections on 9 July. According to him, those voters returned absentee ballots and then showed up at polling places on election day. In 2022, Georgia swung back substantially to the right towards Republicans with incumbent Republican Governor Brian Kemp winning reelection by almost double digits at 7.6% over Democrat Stacey Abrams with a raw vote margin of over 300,000 votes. Every other Republican statewide in Georgia won their elections by a margin of 5-10% in 2022. However Raphael Warnock narrowly won election to his first full term in a December runoff against Republican opponent Herschel Walker who came within 1-2 points of Warnock but fell short. Indicating Georgia has significantly moved into being a red leaning purple state with a PVI of R+3 and regarded by many to be one of, if not the most competitive states in the country. Republicans continuing to dominate and maintain complete control at the state level in Georgia, but the federal level is extremely competitive.

See also
Political party strength in Georgia (U.S. state)
United States presidential elections in Georgia
2010 United States Senate election in Georgia
2010 Georgia gubernatorial election
1998 Georgia gubernatorial election
2008 United States Senate election in Georgia
2008 United States House of Representatives elections in Georgia
Government of Georgia (U.S. state)
Politics of Georgia (U.S. state)
Women's suffrage in Georgia (U.S. state)
2018 Georgia state elections
2020 Georgia state elections

Presidential elections 
1964 Presidential election
1968 Presidential election
1980 Presidential election
1984 Presidential election
1988 Presidential election
1992 Presidential election
1996 Presidential election
2000 Presidential election
2004 Presidential election
2008 Presidential election
2012 Presidential election
2016 Presidential election
2020 Presidential election

Presidential primaries 
2008 Democratic Primary
2008 Republican Primary

References

Atlas of U.S. Elections

Further reading

External links
Elections at the Georgia Secretary of State official website

 
 
  (State affiliate of the U.S. League of Women Voters)
 . (Also: 1995 & 1996, 1997 & 1998, 1999 & 2000, 2001 & 2002, 2003 & 2004,  2005 & 2006, 2007 & 2008, 2009 & 2010, 2011 & 2012, 2013 & 2014, 2015 & 2016, 2017 & 2018).
 Digital Public Library of America. Assorted materials related to Georgia elections
 

 
Government of Georgia (U.S. state)
Political events in Georgia (U.S. state)